FSGP 2013 was held at Circuit of the Americas in Austin, Texas. Oregon State University's Phoenix took first place overall, while Illinois State University's Mercury IV finished one lap behind in second place, and Iowa State University's Hyperion finished one lap behind them in third place.

Auto races in the United States